2005 in philosophy

Events 
 Jaakko Hintikka was awarded the Rolf Schock Prize in Logic and Philosophy "for his pioneering contributions to the logical analysis of modal concepts, in particular the concepts of knowledge and belief".

Publications 
 Graham Harman, "Guerrilla Metaphysics: Phenomenology and the Carpentry of Things" (2005)
 Michel Onfray, Atheist Manifesto (2005)

Deaths 
 February 3 - Ernst Mayr (born 1904)
 March 11 - Harry Prosch (born 1917)
 May 20 - Paul Ricœur (born 1913)

References 

Philosophy
21st-century philosophy
Philosophy by year